Savino is a rural locality (a village) in Gorkinskoye Rural Settlement, Kirzhachsky District, Vladimir Oblast, Russia. The population was 123 as of 2010. There are 7 streets.

Geography 
Savino is located on the Kirzhach River, 13 km north of Kirzhach (the district's administrative centre) by road. Ivashevo is the nearest rural locality.

References 

Rural localities in Kirzhachsky District